Orgères refers to two communes in France:
Orgères, Ille-et-Vilaine
Orgères, Orne